Valley Spring may refer to:

Valley Springs, California, United States
Valley Spring, Texas, United States

See also 
 Spring Valley (disambiguation)